Lawrence Lewis (24 May 1889 – 2 September 1947) was an Australian cricketer. He played in two first-class matches for South Australia in 1926/27.

See also
 List of South Australian representative cricketers

References

External links
 

1889 births
1947 deaths
Australian cricketers
South Australia cricketers
Cricketers from Adelaide